Tuzech Mi Geet Gaat Aahe is an Indian Marathi language drama television series directed by Kedar Vaidya. It was broadcast on Star Pravah from 2 May 2022. It stars Avni Taywade, Abhijeet Khandkekar, Priya Marathe and Urmilla Kothare in lead roles.

Plot 
This show follows a girl, Swara, a singer who goes to Mumbai after her mother's death, in search of her father whose identity she does not know.

Mahaepisode (1 hour) 
 10 July 2022
 11 September 2022
 27 November 2022
 1 January 2023
 5 March 2023

Cast

Main 
 Avani Taywade as Swara Kamat – Malhar and Vaidehi's daughter; Pihu's half-sister
 Abhijeet Khandkekar as Lavdya Malhar Kamat – A famous musician and singer; Seema's younger son; Vijay's brother; Vaidehi's former husband; Monika's husband; Swara and Pihu's father
 Urmilla Kothare as Vaidehi Kamat – Niranjan's sister; Malhar's former wife; Swara's mother

Recurring 
 Priya Marathe as Monika Rajadhyaksha Kamat – Vikram and Eela's daughter; Malhar's wife; Pihu's mother
 Avanee Joshi as Priya "Pihu" Kamat – Malhar and Monika's daughter; Swara's half-sister
 Vikram Gokhale as Pandit Mukund Narayan
 Sachin Deshpande as Vijay Kamat – Seema's elder son; Malhar's brother; Kshama's husband
 Pallavi Vaidya as Kshama Kamat – Vijay's wife
 Kanchan Gupte as Seema Kamat – Vijay and Malhar's mother; Swara and Pihu's grandmother
 Umesh Bane as Niranjan – Vaidehi's brother; Shyamala's husband
 Deepti Joshi as Shyamala – Niranjan's wife
 Shailesh Datar as Vikram Rajadhyaksha – Eela's husband; Monika's father; Pihu's grandfather
 Sunila Karambelkar as Eela Rajadhyaksha – Vijay's wife; Monika's mother; Pihu's grandmother
 Dhanashri Bhalekar as Suhani – Monika's friend
 Vanita Kharat as Ranjana

Production

Development 
Tejendra Neswankar the producer of Trrump Carrd Production announces the Marathi remake of Potol Kumar Gaanwala a Bengali series aired on Star Jalsha. The title song was composed by Avadhoot Gupte and lyrics by Rohini Ninawe. 18 songs recorded for the series.

Casting 
Abhijeet Khandkekar selected for the role of Malhar Kamat. Urmilla Kothare selected for the role of Vaidehi. Avani Taywade made debut role as Swara. Priya Marathe will also featured in the series.

References

External links 
 Tuzech Mi Geet Gaat Aahe at Disney+ Hotstar

Marathi-language television shows
2022 Indian television series debuts
Star Pravah original programming